

Iron Baron was a settlement associated with the Iron Baron iron ore mine on Eyre Peninsula at the southern edge of  South Australia's Far North region,  north-west of Adelaide.

The settlement was situated about 200 metres from the eastern boundary of the mine. BHP owned and serviced the settlement, having built it about 1938. There were several dozen houses, a one-teacher primary school, a general store, oval, swimming pool, netball courts, picnic areas and licensed community club.

Before the mine’s re-opening in 2011, BHP bulldozed all the settlement's surface infrastructure, including buildings, into a pit at the mine. Employees now commute from Whyalla or elsewhere.

Operation of the nearby mine
The Iron Baron mine is one of several large orebodies in the Middleback Range, with a production capacity of about two million tonnes of haematite a year. Built by BHP in 1933, it went out of operation between 1947 and 1958; it was re-opened in 2011. On-site facilities now include a fully functional ore beneficiation plant.

Related mines 

 Iron Knob
 Iron Knight
 Iron Duke

See also
List of cities and towns in South Australia

References 

Towns in South Australia
Mining in South Australia
Far North (South Australia)
Iron ore mines in Australia
Eyre Peninsula
Places in the unincorporated areas of South Australia